Sergei Aleksandrovich Trubitsin (born 5 December 1959) is a Russian football manager and a former player.

Playing career
He is third on the all-time PFC Spartak Nalchik most games list with over 440 official games for the team.

References

1959 births
Sportspeople from Nalchik
Living people
Soviet footballers
Association football midfielders
PFC Spartak Nalchik players
FC Volgar Astrakhan players
Russian footballers
Kuopion Palloseura players
Russian expatriate footballers
Expatriate footballers in Finland
Russian football managers
PFC Spartak Nalchik managers